Ralf Außem (born 1 September 1960) is a former German footballer and currently youth team manager of 1. FC Köln.

Playing career 
Außem made Bundesliga debut with 1. FC Köln on 24 May 1980 against Werder Bremen, though he only played two minutes in his debut performance. He made his name in the eighties with SC Fortuna Köln.

Managerial career 
From 2002 to 2004 he managed SC Fortuna Köln. He later became manager of Rot-Weiss Essen.

In September 2011, he was named caretaker manager of Alemannia Aachen following the sacking of Peter Hyballa. After one game (a 0–0 against SpVgg Greuther Fürth), Friedhelm Funkel took the job and had it until 1 April 2012 when he was put on a leave, too. After that, Außem got the job again as a caretaker until the end of the 2011–12 season.

References 

1960 births
Living people
German footballers
Association football defenders
Bundesliga players
2. Bundesliga players
1. FC Köln players
FC Viktoria Köln players
Hannover 96 players
SC Fortuna Köln players
German football managers
Alemannia Aachen managers
Rot-Weiss Essen managers
2. Bundesliga managers
SC Fortuna Köln managers
3. Liga managers
Footballers from Cologne
20th-century German people
West German footballers